Nikolai Nikolaevich Yeremenko Sr. (() was a Belarusian Soviet film and theater actor. People's Artist of the USSR (1989).

Member of the Great Patriotic War. He managed to survive in a Nazi concentration camp.

After graduating in 1948, the studio theater of the Yakub Kolas Belarusian Drama Theater in Vitebsk, he became a theater actor (1948-1959). Since 1959 - an actor of Yanka Kupala National Academic Theatre.

He began acting in films in 1960.

His son was also an actor, Nikolai Yeremenko Jr. (1949-2001).

Partial filmography

Vperedi - krutoy povorot (1960) - Nikolay Radevich
Lyudi i zveri (1962) - Alexej Ivanovic Pavlov
Moskva - Genuya (1964) - Rusanov
Pogonya (1965) - Anatoli Ivanovich - ranger
Dni lyotnye (1966) - Nikolay Nikolayevich
Ryadom s vami (1967) - Passerby
Zapomnim etot den (1968) - Grigoriy Yasen
Ivan Makarovich (1968) - Ivan's Father
Desyataya dolya puti (1969) - Bukhteyev
Schastlivyy chelovek (1970) - Minor Role
Krusheniye imperii (1971) - Sergey Dmitriyevich Vaulin
Liberation III: Direction of the Main Blow (1971) - Josip Broz Tito
Mirovoy paren (1971) - Kalinkovich
More v ogne (1972) - Zhidilov
Hot Snow (1972) - leytenant Volodya Drozdovsky
Karpukhin (1973) - Prosecutor Vladimir Ovsyannikov
Plamya (1974) - chlen Stavki
Molodost s nami (1978) - Pavel Petrovich Kolosov
Raspisaniye na poslezavtra (1979) - Grandpa Bagration
Vkus khleba (1979)
Starye dolgi (1979) - Lyubetskiy
Petrovka, 38 (1980) - General militsii
Amnistiya (1981)
Otstupnik (1987) - Doron
Nevozvrashchenets (1991) - Viktor Andreyevich
Roman 'alla russa (1994)
Syn za ottsa... (1995)

References

External links

 Николай Еременко ст.

1926 births
2000 deaths
Actors from Novosibirsk
Communist Party of the Soviet Union members
Soviet male film actors
Soviet male stage actors
Soviet male voice actors
Russian male film actors
Belarusian male actors
20th-century Belarusian male actors
Belarusian male stage actors
Belarusian male film actors
Soviet military personnel of World War II
Soviet prisoners of war
People's Artists of the USSR
Recipients of the Byelorussian SSR State Prize